Greenshirts or Green shirts can mean:

Politics
 Brazilian Integralist Action, a political party in Brazil
 Green Shirt Movement for Social Credit, a political party in the United Kingdom
 "Green Shirts", agrarian militias founded by Henri Dorgères in France
 Greenshirts (National Corporate Party), a fascist political party in Ireland
 Hungarian National Socialist Party, a fascist political party in Hungary
 Iron Guard, a fascist political party and paramilitary force in Romania
 Juventudes de Acción Popular, the youth organization of Popular Action, a political party in Spain
 Lega Nord ("Northern League"), a regionalist political party in Italy
 Young Egypt Party (1933), a nationalist political party in Egypt
 Yugoslav Radical Union, a fascist political party in the Kingdom of Yugoslavia

Sports
 Pakistan national cricket team
 Pakistan men's national field hockey team

Other
 Greenshirts (G.I. Joe), a G.I. Joe character
 GREEN SHIRTS, an eco fashion clothing brand from Germany